Victoria Charlotte of Anhalt-Bernburg-Schaumburg-Hoym (25 September 1715 – 4 February 1772) was a princess of Anhalt-Bernburg-Schaumburg-Hoym by birth and Margravine of Brandenburg-Bayreuth by marriage.

Life 
Victoria Charlotte was a daughter of Prince Victor I of Anhalt-Bernburg-Schaumburg-Hoym (1693–1772) from his first marriage to Charlotte Louise (1680–1739), daughter of Count William Maurice of Isenburg-Birstein.

On 26 April 1732 she married the later Margrave Frederick Christian of Brandenburg-Bayreuth (1708–1769) in Schaumburg. After the wedding the couple moved into the New Castle in Neustadt an der Aisch at the request Frederick Christian's brother George Frederick Charles.

The marriage ended in divorce in 1764, a year after Frederick Christian succeeded his brother as Margrave of Brandenburg-Bayreuth.  The couple had already lived separately since 1739 because Frederick Christian was very jealous. Victoria Charlotte spent the last years of her life in humble conditions in Halle.

She died in 1772 and was buried in the Melander Crypt in Holzappel.

Issue 
From her marriage, Victoria Charlotte had two daughters:
 Christiane Sophie Charlotte (1733–1757)
 married in 1757 Duke Ernest Frederick III Carl of Saxe-Hildburghausen (1727–1780)
 Sophie Magdalene (1737–1737)

Footnotes

References 
 Philipp Ernst Bertram, Johann C. Krause: Geschichte des Hauses und Fürstenthums Anhalt: Fortsetzung, vol. 2, p. 643 ff

|-

House of Ascania
Margravines of Brandenburg-Bayreuth
1715 births
1772 deaths
18th-century German people
Daughters of monarchs